Andrew H. Dahl (April 13, 1859 – January 23, 1928) was a politician in Wisconsin.

Dahl was born in Lewiston, Wisconsin. He attended high school in Viroqua, Wisconsin.

Career
Dahl was supervisor of the village of Westby, Wisconsin, from 1896 to 1897 and was a member of the Wisconsin State Assembly from 1899 to 1907. Additionally, he was the Village President of Westby from 1899 to 1902. He served a Treasurer of Wisconsin from 1907 to 1913. In 1912, he was a delegate to the Republican National Convention that nominated incumbent William Howard Taft for President of the United States, spurring the historic three-way campaign between Taft, former President Theodore Roosevelt and New Jersey Governor Woodrow Wilson with Wilson ultimately winning. He was a supporter of Governor Robert M. La Follette, Sr. and in 1914 ran for the office of Governor of Wisconsin was the Wisconsin Progressive Party ticket. Dahl died suddenly on January 23, 1928, in La Crosse, Wisconsin.

References

People from Columbia County, Wisconsin
People from Westby, Wisconsin
Wisconsin city council members
Mayors of places in Wisconsin
Republican Party members of the Wisconsin State Assembly
State treasurers of Wisconsin
Wisconsin Progressives (1924)
20th-century American politicians
1859 births
1928 deaths
Madison Business College alumni